Malagoniella is a genus of (formerly canthonini) in the beetle family Scarabaeidae. There are about 10 described species in Malagoniella.

Species
These 10 species belong to the genus Malagoniella:
 Malagoniella argentina (Gillet, 1911)
 Malagoniella astyanax (Olivier, 1789)
 Malagoniella bicolor (Guérin-Méneville, 1840)
 Malagoniella chalybaea (Blanchard, 1846)
 Malagoniella coerulea (Balthasar, 1939)
 Malagoniella cupreicollis (Waterhouse, 1890)
 Malagoniella lanei (Lange, 1945)
 Malagoniella magnifica (Balthasar, 1939)
 Malagoniella puncticollis (Blanchard, 1846)
 Malagoniella virens (Harold, 1869)

References

Further reading

 
 
 
 

Deltochilini
Articles created by Qbugbot